A gugel was a type of hood with a trailing point, popularly worn in medieval Germany.

Description
It was tailored to fit the head and shoulders, and was usually made from wool or loden. Originally worn by commoners, it became fashionable with the nobility from the 14th century. In the fashionable style, the gugel was worn on top of the head like a hat, with the head-part inverted inside the collar, which then hung over the ears.

Distribution
From about 1360, this style of gugel was also worn outside Germany, being called a chaperon in France and a cappucio in Italy. By about 1400 the trailing point was sometimes of ridiculous proportions.

See also
 Liripipe
 Pointy hat

References
 Gugel in the German-language Wikipedia. Retrieved 9 May 2015. Includes pictures

Hoods (headgear)
Medieval European costume